Robert Hugh "Hadley" Fraser (born 21 April 1980) is an English actor and singer. He made his West End debut as Marius in Les Misérables. He also originated the role of Tiernan in the Broadway show The Pirate Queen.

Life and career 
Fraser was born in Windsor, Berkshire. He holds a BA from Birmingham University and a Postgraduate Diploma from the Royal Academy of Music. In 2011, he was made an Associate of the Royal Academy of Music, or ARAM. He has performed in a number of West End productions, and played Gareth in the Doctor Who episode "Army of Ghosts" (2006).

In 2009, Fraser played the recurring role of Reed in The Fresh Beat Band season 1, in the last 2 seasons, he was replaced by Patrick Levis.) In May 2010, he returned to the West End to play the role of El Gallo in The Fantasticks.

In October 2010 Fraser sang the Les Misérables role of Grantaire in the 25th Anniversary concert at West End.

On 23 June 2011 Fraser returned to the West End production of Les Misérables, this time to play the role of Javert. He received critical acclaim for the role and remained with the show until June 2012.

On 1 and 2 October 2011 Fraser played Raoul in the 25th Anniversary staging of The Phantom of the Opera at the Royal Albert Hall in London. He appeared alongside Ramin Karimloo and Sierra Boggess, who played the Phantom and Christine, respectively. Fraser also co-starred with Karimloo in the 25th Anniversary concert of Les Misérables. Hadley has written music for a band called "Sheytoons" with Karimloo, including "Heading West" and "Driftwood".

Fraser appeared in the film adaptation of Les Misérables, as the Army General of the National Guard.

In 2012, Fraser sang "Beyond the Door" on the concept album for The In-Between, as the character of Calicus.

Fraser appeared aside Tom Hiddleston in the Donmar Warehouse's production of Coriolanus from 6 December 2013 to 13 February 2014.

On 5 October 2014 Hadley married his long-time girlfriend actress Rosalie Craig. The couple have a daughter who was in 2016.

In December 2014 he returned to the Donmar Warehouse to play Stine in City of Angels, alongside his wife Rosalie Craig as Gabby/Bobbi and Samantha Barks as Mallory/Avril.

An avid musician, as well, Fraser can be heard on Scott Alan's releases Keys and Scott Alan LIVE, as well as his own EP, "Just Let Go", released in August 2014 via social media and digital download (no hardcopy has been released).

He is the co-lyricist and co-book writer (with Josie Rourke) for the new musical Committee... (full title The Public Administration and Constitutional Affairs Committee Takes Oral Evidence on Whitehall's Relationship with Kids Company) with music by Tom Deering, which will premiere at the Donmar Warehouse from 23 June to 12 August 2017.

He played Frederick Frankenstein in the UK premiere of the Mel Brooks musical Young Frankenstein in August 2017 at the Garrick Theatre in London's West End, following a try-out run at the Theatre Royal, Newcastle.

Acting credits

Film

Theatre

Discography

References

External links 
 
 
 
 Fresh Face: Hadley Fraser

1980 births
English male musical theatre actors
English male stage actors
Living people
Alumni of the University of Birmingham